Michèle Deslauriers (born January 17, 1946) is a Canadian actress. She is the wife of actor Sébastien Dhavernas and the mother of actress Caroline Dhavernas and voice actress Gabrielle Dhavernas. She provides the voice announcing stops, service interruptions, and special messages for the Montreal Metro.

Filmography
 Nic et Pic (1971)
 Y'a pas de problème (unknown episodes, 1975) .... Mme Martel
 Passe-Partout (7 episodes, "L'éléphant", "L'été s'en vient", "Bon coup, mauvais coup", "Le sable c'est fait pour...", "Le chocolat", "On joue à la cachette" and "L'épicerie", 1977–1979) .... Bijou / Zig Zag / Ti-Brin 3x / Ti-Brin and Zig Zag / Ti-Brin (voice)
 Chocolate Eclair (Éclair au chocolat) (1979) ....
 Pop Citrouille (unknown episodes, 1979) .... Various
 Bye Bye (5 episodes, "Bye-Bye 1980", "Bonne année Roger", "Bye-Bye 1982", "Bye-Bye 1986" and "Bye-Bye 1987", 1980–1987) .... Various
 Le 101, ouest, avenue des Pins (unknown episodes, 1984) .... Marie-Pierre
 L'Amour avec un Grand A (1 episode, "Marie, Martine et Martin", 1986) .... Yvette
 Chambres en ville (unknown episodes, 1989) .... Sage-femme
 Marilyn (unknown episodes, 1991) ....
 Denise... aujourd'hui (unknown episodes, 1991) .... Carmen
 La princesse astronaute (unknown episodes, 1993) .... Actrice tragédienne
 Cap Tourmente (1993) .... Madame Huot
 Les intrépides (unknown episodes, 1993) .... Voleuse de violons
 René Lévesque (unknown episodes, 1994) .... Judith Jasmin
 Lapoisse et Jobard (unknown episodes, 1997) .... Détective
 La petite vie (2 episodes, "Mlle Morin" and "Le divorce II", 1998) .... Directrice du salon funéraire and Gérarde
 XChange (2000) .... Mrs. Scott
 Le Monde de Charlotte (unknown episodes, 2000) .... Rachel Boulanger
 La promesse (unknown episodes, 2005) .... Corinne Giasson Marion
 Et Dieu créa Laflaque (1 episode, "Y'a t'il un pépére dans l'avion", 2006) .... Georgette (voice)
 Le Cœur a ses raisons (19 episodes, 2005–2007) .... Madge
 Mars et Avril .... Voix de la STM (voice)
 Les Beaux Malaises .... Monique, mère de Martin

References

External links
 

1946 births
Actresses from Quebec
Canadian film actresses
Canadian television actresses
French Quebecers
Living people